Thorvald Konradsson the Far Traveller was one of the first Christian missionaries in Iceland and then in Belarus in the late 10th century. He was native to Iceland but went abroad where he was baptized by one Bishop Friedrich, a German. He returned to the island in Bishop Friedrich's retinue in 981. They were especially active in proselytising among the inhabitants of the northern parts of Iceland. However, Thorvald killed two men in a battle and was expelled from the island in 986.

See also
Christianisation of Iceland
Stefnir Thorgilsson
Thangbrand

Footnotes

References

Christian missionaries in Iceland
Icelandic missionaries